The 2019–20 UAE President's Cup was the 44th edition of the UAE President's Cup, a football cup competition of the United Arab Emirates. The winner will qualify for the 2021 AFC Champions League. The tournament was cancelled along with the rest of the UAE league season.

Preliminary round
In the preliminary round, eleven teams were divided into two groups, one containing six teams while the other containing five.

Group A

Group B

Bracket
As per UAE Football Association matches database:

Round of 16
All times are local (UTC+04:00)

Quarter-finals

Semi-finals

Final

References

UAE President's Cup seasons
UAE
President's Cup
UAE Presidents Cup, 2019-20